Frederick Daniel Fechtman (August 10, 1910 – July 11, 1991) was an American professional basketball player. He played in the National Basketball League for the Indianapolis Kautskys in three games during the 1937–38 season. Fechtman had never played an organized game of basketball before playing for Indiana University, and at the time he was enrolled he was the tallest person at the school. Later in life he became a high school coach and school superintendent.

References

1910 births
1991 deaths
American men's basketball players
Basketball players from Indianapolis
Centers (basketball)
High school basketball coaches in the United States
Indiana Hoosiers men's basketball players
Indianapolis Kautskys players